The Church of Jesus Christ of Latter-day Saints in Utah refers to the Church of Jesus Christ of Latter-day Saints (LDS Church) and its members in Utah. Utah has more church members than any other U.S. state or country. The LDS Church is also the largest denomination in Utah.

History

A brief history can be found at the church's Newsroom (Utah) or Deseret News 2010 Church Almanac

Membership history

Though membership in Utah has increased, the percentage of Utahns who are Latter-day Saints has declined.  Much of this is due to the rapid growth of the state. In 2008, the US Census Bureau determined Utah to be the fastest growing state in the country in terms of population growth.

County statistics

List of LDS Church adherents in each county as of 2010 according to the Association of Religion Data Archives:

Missions
Due to nonmembers coming into the state, Utah officially became a mission field with its own headquarters in 1975 when the Utah Salt Lake City Mission was organized.  Previously, full-time missionaries worked in parts of Utah under the leadership of missions headquartered in other states.

As of February 2023, Utah has 10 missions and a Missionary Training Center.

In addition to these missions, the New Mexico Farmington Mission covers Southeastern Utah.

Missionary Training Center

The first training for missionaries began in 1832 with the School of the Prophets. Some further educational centers were:
The Brigham Young Academy (1894)
The Ricks Academy (early 1900s)
The Latter-Day Saint University (1902)
The Salt Lake Mission Home (1924)
The Missionary Language Institute (1961)
The Language Training Mission (1962)
And finally, the Provo Missionary Training Center (1978)

Temples

As of October 2022, Utah has 17 operating temples, with another 11 that have been announced or under construction.

Dedicated 1800s

Dedicated 1900s

Dedicated 2000s

Under Construction

Communities
Latter-day Saints had a significant role in establishing and settling communities within the "Mormon Corridor", including the following in Utah:

American Fork
Beaver
Brigham City
Cedar City
Cornish
Delta
Deseret
Ephraim
Fillmore
Green River
Gunnison
Heber
Hurricane
Layton
Lehi
Logan
Magna
Manti
Mapleton
Moab
Monroe
Nephi
Orem
Ogden
Payson
Pleasant Grove
Price
Provo
Richfield
Roy
Salem
Salina
Salt Lake City
Sandy
Santaquin
Saratoga Springs
Sevier
Spanish Fork
Spring Lake
Springville
St. George
Tooele
Vernal
West Valley City

See also

State of Deseret
Religion in Utah

References

External links
 The Church of Jesus Christ of Latter-day Saints Official site
 The Church of Jesus Christ of Latter-day Saints Utah Area
 The Church of Jesus Christ of Latter-day Saints Newsroom
 ComeUntoChrist.org Latter-day Saints Visitor site